The Lebăda Est oil field is an oil field located on the continental shelf of the Black Sea. It was discovered in 1987 and developed by Petrom. It began production in 1989 and produces oil. The field also produces around 53.5 million cubic feet/day (1.5×105m³) of gas and has reserves of 242 billion cubic feet (6.9×109m³).

References

Black Sea energy
Oil fields in Romania